Cullison may refer to:

Cullison, Kansas, U.S., city
Cullison (surname)

See also
Collison (disambiguation)